Kamazan-e Sofla Rural District is a rural district (dehestan) in Zand District, Malayer County, Hamadan Province, Iran. At the 2006 census, its population was 4,985, in 1,241 families. The rural district has 25 villages.

References 

Rural Districts of Hamadan Province
Malayer County